Portulaca amilis, known as Paraguayan purslane, is a species of Portulaca native to South America. It was introduced to the southeastern United States and other countries around the world and can be found in sandy soil in disturbed areas, roadsides, fields, lawns and gardens.

Description
Appearance is similar to Portulaca oleracea. The ends of the foliage are sharp and flowers are normally pink.

References

Further reading
 Portulaca amilis (Paraguayan Purslane) : A Tropical Immigrant to North Carolina

Flora of South America
amilis
Taxa named by Carlo Luigi Spegazzini